Cape Breton The Lakes was a provincial electoral district in Nova Scotia, Canada, that elected one member of the Nova Scotia House of Assembly.

It was created in 1978 out of areas which were formerly included in the Cape Breton North, Cape Breton South, and Cape Breton West.
In 2003, it was reallocated to Victoria-The Lakes, Cape Breton South, Cape Breton North and Cape Breton West.

Members of the Legislative Assembly
Brian Boudreau, Liberal (1999 - 2003)
Helen MacDonald, NDP (1997-1999)
Bernie Boudreau, Liberal (1988-1997)
John Newell, Progressive Conservative (1983-1988)
Ossie Fraser, Liberal (1978-October 29, 1982)

Election results

1978 general election

1981 general election

1983 by-election 

|-

|Progressive Conservative
|John Newell
|align="right"|3190
|align="right"|38.28
|align="right"|-3.22
|-

|Liberal
|John Coady
|align="right"|3078
|align="right"|36.93
|align="right"|-6.07
|-

|NDP
|Gerald Yetman
|align="right"|1436
|align="right"|17.23
|align="right"|+1.75
|-

|Labour
|Gary Mosher
|align="right"|630
|align="right"|7.56
|align="right"|
|}

1984 general election

1988 general election

1993 general election

1997 by-election 

|-

|NDP
|Helen MacDonald
|align="right"|3727
|align="right"|49.19
|align="right"|+34.88
|-

|Liberal
|Allan Henderson
|align="right"|3055
|align="right"|40.32
|align="right"|-31.58
|-

|Progressive Conservative
|Rollie Clarke
|align="right"|795
|align="right"|10.49
|align="right"|-3.31
|}

1998 general election

1999 general election

References

Elections Nova Scotia - Summary Results from 1867 to 2011 (PDF)

Former provincial electoral districts of Nova Scotia